Naples Reef is a fringing reef located off the Gaviota Coast of Santa Barbara County, California. It is an underwater pinnacle and cave system that is a popular scuba diving and fishing area. There are fishing restrictions in place, however recreational take by spearfishing of white seabass and pelagic finfish is allowed.

Ecology
Naples Reef is a rich, productive habitat, with anemone-covered underwater walls rising 30-feet from the sea floor and a kelp forest that supports various fish and wildlife. White seabass, kelp bass, rockfish, colorful nudibranchs, red gorgonians, pelicans, harbor seals and a variety of crabs, lobster and scallops all share the reef.  This coastal area is home to many threatened and endangered animals such as the steelhead trout, the tidewater goby, the white-tailed kite, and the red-legged frog.

Environmental concerns
Naples reef faces a variety of threats including overfishing, coastal development and climate change. It is one of the most biologically productive locations in all of Southern California and despite being a mainland reef, it is ecologically more connected to the northern Channel Islands.

Naples State Marine Conservation Area (SMCA) is a marine protected area that protects Naples Reef which is about three-quarters of a mile offshore along the middle of the pristine and rural Gaviota Coast in Santa Barbara County on California’s south coast. The SMCA covers 2.58 square miles. The MPAs protects marine life by limiting the removal of wildlife from within its borders.

Cultural concerns 
The area has immense historic and cultural importance for local Native American tribes. The federally recognized tribe of Santa Ynez Band of Chumash Indians is exempt from fish take regulations but shall comply with all other existing regulations and statutes. The United States Department of the Interior has declared the adjacent undeveloped coastline "globally significant".

See also 
Santa Barbara Channel
Channel Islands (California)

References

Landforms of Santa Barbara County, California
Reefs of California